Guaymango is a municipality in the Ahuachapán department of El Salvador.

External links 

Municipalities of the Ahuachapán Department